This is a list of notable events in Latin music (i.e. Spanish- and Portuguese-speaking music from Latin America, Europe, and the United States) that took place in 1996.

Events 
February 28 – The 38th Annual Grammy Awards are held at the Shrine Auditorium in Los Angeles, California.
Jon Secada wins the Grammy Award for Best Latin Pop Performance for his album Amor.
Gloria Estefan wins the Grammy Award for Best Tropical Latin Performance for her album Abriendo Puertas.
Flaco Jiménez wins the Grammy Award for Best Mexican-American/Tejano Performance for his album Flaco Jiménez.
Antônio Carlos Jobim posthumously wins the Grammy Award for Best Latin Jazz Album for his album Antonio Brasileiro.
 March 2 – A Learjet 25 carrying members of Brazilian comedy rock band Mamonas Assassinas crashes into the Cantareira mountain range killing everyone on board. 
 April 29-May 1: The seventh annual Billboard Latin Music conference took place.
 The third annual Billboard Latin Music Awards are also held on May. Selena becomes the most awarded artist of the award ceremony, receiving four award posthumously including Hot Latin Tracks Artist of the Year. Mexican singer Juan Gabriel is inducted into the Billboard Latin Music Hall of Fame.
 May 9 – The 8th Annual Lo Nuestro Awards are held at the James L. Knight Center in Miami, Florida. Cuban-American singer Gloria Estefan is the biggest winner with four awards.

Bands formed 
Luis Damón
Dark Latin Groove
Grupo Límite
Letty Guval (Tejano)
La Makina
Matanza
Noemy (Tejano)
Nydia Rojas (Tejano)
Fey

Bands reformed

Bands disbanded

Bands on hiatus

Number-ones albums and singles by country 
List of number-one albums of 1996 (Spain)
List of number-one singles of 1996 (Spain)
List of number-one Billboard Top Latin Albums of 1996
List of number-one Billboard Hot Latin Tracks of 1996

Awards 
1996 Premio Lo Nuestro
1996 Billboard Latin Music Awards
1996 Tejano Music Awards

Albums released

First quarter

January

February

March

Second quarter

April

May

June

Third quarter

July
{| class="wikitable sortable" style="text-align: left;"
|-
! Day
! Title
! Artist
! Genre(s)
! Singles
! Label
|-
|2
| Jazzin'''
| Tito Puente and La India
| 
| 
|
|-
|5
| O Samba Poconé| Skank
| 
| 
|
|-
|9
| La Makina...A Mil| La Makina
| Merengue
| "Mi Reina"
|
|-
|11
| Voces Unidas| Various artists
| 
| "Puedes Llegar"
|
|-
|16
| La Rosa de los Vientos	| Rubén Blades
| 
| 
|
|-
|18
| Macarena Non Stop| Los del Río
| 
| 
|
|-
|rowspan="2"|23
| Unidos Para Siempre| Los Tigres del Norte
| 
| 
|
|-
| Fuera de Este Mundo| Franco De Vita
| Latin pop
| 
|
|-
|24
| En Pleno Vuelo| Marco Antonio Solís
| Regional Mexican
| "Que Pena Me Das""Recuerdos, Tristezas y Soledad""Así Como Te Conocí"
|Fonovisa
|-
|}

August

September

Fourth quarter
October

November

December

 Unknown date 

Best-selling records
Best-selling albums
The following is a list of the top 10 best-selling Latin albums in the United States in 1996, according to Billboard.

Best-performing songs
The following is a list of the top 10 best-performing Latin songs in the United States in 1996, according to Billboard''.

Births 
February 3 – Luis Coronel, Mexican-American banda singer
June 24Duki, Argentine rapper
June 25Lele Pons, Venezuelan-American pop singer

Deaths 
February 13 – , Chilean bolero singer
March 24 – Lola Beltrán, Mexican ranchera singer and actress
September 7 – Gilda, Argentine cumbia singer
October 11 – Renato Russo, founder and former lead singer of Brazilian rock band Legião Urbana

References 

 
Latin music by year